Jette Müller (born 1 October 2003) is a German diver.

Diving career 
Müller participated in the World Junior Diving Championships 2018 and 2021. In the 2021 FINA World Junior Diving Championships, she won two gold medals (Girls A 1 m and Girls A 3 m).   

She missed the German championships in 2021 due to a thumb injury, which made it impossible for her to qualify for the 2020 Summer Olympics in Tokyo. 

Müller represented Germany at the 2022 World Aquatics Championships in Budapest, where she finished 7th in the women's 1 m springboard event. She finished 4th in the 1 m event at the 2022 European Aquatics Championships in Rome.

References

External links 
 

German female divers
2003 births
Living people
21st-century German women